Berton Hulon James  (July 17, 1886 – January 2, 1959) was an outfielder in Major League Baseball. Nicknamed "Jesse", he played in six games for the St. Louis Cardinals in September, 1909 and had 6 hits in 21 at-bats. He played in the minor leagues through 1919, primarily in the Texas League.

External links

1886 births
1959 deaths
Baseball players from Tennessee
Major League Baseball outfielders
St. Louis Cardinals players
Scottdale Millers players
Grafton Wanderers players
Shreveport Pirates (baseball) players
Waco Navigators players
El Reno Packers players
Galveston Sand Crabs players
Nashville Vols players
Austin Senators players
New Orleans Pelicans (baseball) players
People from Robertson County, Tennessee